The second USS Grayling (SP-1259) was a United States Navy patrol vessel in commission from 1917 to 1918.

History 
Grayling was built as a civilian motorboat of the same name in 1915 by Boyden at Amesbury, Massachusetts. The U.S. Navy acquired her from her owner, E. E. Gray, on 7 May 1917 for World War I service as a patrol vessel. She was commissioned on 22 May 1917 as USS Grayling (SP-1259).

Assigned to the 1st Naval District and based at Boston, Massachusetts, Grayling served on section patrol duties in Boston Harbor for the remainder of World War I.

Grayling was then returned to Gray on 30 November 1918.

 Grayling is distinct from USS Grayling (SP-289), a different patrol vessel in commission during World War I.

References

NavSource Online: Section Patrol Craft Photo Archive: Grayling (SP 1259)

Patrol vessels of the United States Navy
World War I patrol vessels of the United States
Ships built in Amesbury, Massachusetts
1915 ships